Barbara Parker is city attorney of Oakland, California.

Information

Barbara J. Parker is the elected City Attorney of Oakland, CA and the recipient of the 2015 Public Lawyer of the Year award from the State Bar of California. The Ronald M. George Public Lawyer of the Year Award recognizes public attorneys who have provided outstanding service to the public and possess an exemplary reputation in the legal community and the highest of ethical standards.

Parker is the first and only African American woman elected to citywide office in Oakland. She and her siblings are the first generation in her family's history to go to college.

Prior to becoming City Attorney, Parker worked in the Oakland City Attorney's Office for about 20 years, including 10 years as second-in-command. Parker's predecessor, John Russo, left the position to become City Manager of neighboring Alameda, California and appointed Parker as Acting City Attorney in June 2011. The Oakland City Council confirmed her as City Attorney on July 19, 2011.
In November 2012, Parker was elected to a 4-year term as Oakland City Attorney, defeating Councilmember Jane Brunner by 68 to 31 percent.

Voters elected Parker to a second 4-year term in November 2016. She ran unopposed.

Parker is a native of Seattle, Washington, where her parents migrated to escape legalized oppression and sharecropping in the rural, segregated South. Parker earned an undergraduate degree in economics from the University of Washington, and she was one of the very few African American women accepted at Harvard Law School in the early 1970s. She graduated from Harvard in 1975 determined to use the law as a tool to help underrepresented communities.
In a legal career spanning four decades, Parker has worked at all levels of government – federal, state and local – including more than 10 years as Chief Assistant of the Oakland City Attorney's Office and more than five years as an Assistant United States Attorney for the Northern District of California. As an Assistant US Attorney, she represented the United States in federal court litigation involving complex matters, including but not limited to medical malpractice, civil rights and breach of contract. Parker also has worked in the private sector for several major law firms and corporations, including the law firm of Pillsbury Madison & Sutro (now Pillsbury Winthrop), Brobeck Phleger & Harrison, Kaiser Aluminum Chemical Corporation and Kaiser Hospitals. In 2005, the State Bar Board of Governors selected Parker for an appointment to the prestigious State Judicial Council. The constitutional agency chaired by the Chief Justice of the California Supreme Court oversees the California courts and is responsible for ensuring the consistent, independent, impartial and accessible administration of justice.  Parker also served as board president of the Black Adoption Placement and Research Center, which for more than 30 years found permanent homes for children, the majority of whom were in California's foster care system.

As City Attorney, Parker has sued numerous hotels and motels for allowing and profiting from prostitution/human trafficking; the Court has closed two hotels for one year, the maximum amount of time allowed by state law. In 2013, Parker won a record $15 million judgment against an immigration consulting business that preyed on and defrauded immigrant families seeking legal residency in the U.S.

Parker's office spearheaded a campaign to crack down on illegal dumping in Oakland using videos and other evidence submitted by the public.

Parker co-authored a comprehensive ethics reform act adopted by the City Council in 2015, and her office has forced slumlords in Oakland to fix substandard and inhumane living conditions.

Major cases include a lawsuit against the federal government to uphold Oakland's right to regulate and license medical cannabis dispensaries, and an antitrust action against big banks that has recovered more than $1 million from financial institutions including Wachovia and JPMorgan.

In 2015, Parker sued the giant chemical company Monsanto to hold it accountable for "vast contamination" of Oakland's storm water system and the San Francisco Bay. Parker's office also filed a federal lawsuit against Wells Fargo to recover damages caused by predatory and discriminatory mortgage lending practices by the bank against African American and Latino borrowers.

Parker co-sponsored a gun safety ordinance to reduce theft of firearms from vehicles. The law makes it a crime to leave firearms, magazines or ammunition unsecured in unattended vehicles on city streets and in other public places.

In 2016, Parker co-sponsored an ordinance that prevents anti-abortion activists from representing themselves as medical professionals or health care counselors. Parker was named a "2016 California Champion of Choice" by NARAL Pro-Choice California for her work on the ordinance. Also in 2016, Parker won a landmark victory in bankruptcy court that allowed the sale and rehabilitation of the notorious Empyrean Towers apartment building in downtown Oakland. The court's ruling was groundbreaking because it was based not only on compensation of creditors, but also recognized the principle of "social responsibility" in bankruptcy law, and guaranteed that the building will be maintained as affordable housing for at least 55 years.

In 2017, Parker partnered with nonprofit Centro Legal de la Raza to sue an Oakland hotel for violations of the city's minimum wage ordinance.

In September 2017, Parker and San Francisco City Attorney Dennis Herrera filed lawsuits against the top five largest investor-owned oil and gas companies.  The lawsuits ask the courts to hold these companies responsible  for the costs of sea walls and other infrastructure necessary to protect  Oakland and San Francisco from ongoing and future consequences of climate change and sea level rise caused by the companies' production of massive  amounts of fossil fuels. Oakland has appealed the trial court's dismissal of its lawsuit.

In January 2018, the Alameda County Bar Association recognized Parker's Office with the Distinguished Service Award (Law Firm of the Year).

In February 2018, Parker's Office filed an environmental justice lawsuit against a debris hauling company that projected dangerous dust into a residential neighborhood. The court ordered the company to cease operations.

In December 2018, Parker filed a federal antitrust and breach of contract lawsuit against the National Football League, Oakland Raiders and the 31 other NFL teams. The lawsuit alleges that NFL owners violated antitrust laws by boycotting Oakland in the marketplace and ignoring the NFL's own policies for team relocation.

Recent actions include: an ultimately successful challenge to the federal government's plan to add a citizenship question to the 2020 census, a major tenant protection lawsuit against the owners of an Oakland real estate empire, and an appeal in the Ninth Circuit Court of Appeals in Oakland's climate change case against major oil companies.

Education
She attended Harvard Law School and graduated in 1975.

Political importances
Parker is an advocate for the following:
civil rights
women's empowerment
children's issues

References

External links 
 Oakland City Attorney
 City Attorney Parker Inauguration Speech 2013
  City Attorney Barbara Parker sits down with Oakland North
 City Attorney's Office Newsletters
 Public Lawyer of the Year Award Acceptance Speech Oct. 9, 2015

Living people
Lawyers from Oakland, California
Women in California politics
Year of birth missing (living people)
Harvard Law School alumni
University of Washington College of Arts and Sciences alumni
Lawyers from Seattle
California Democrats
American women lawyers
20th-century births
21st-century American women